Hericium is a genus of edible mushrooms in the family Hericiaceae. Species in this genus are white and fleshy and grow on dead or dying wood; fruiting bodies resemble a mass of fragile icicle-like spines that are suspended from either a branched supporting framework or from a tough, unbranched cushion of tissue. This distinctive structure has earned Hericium species a variety of common names—monkey's head, lion's mane, and bear's head are examples. Taxonomically, this genus was previously placed within the order Aphyllophorales, but recent molecular studies now place it in the Russulales.

Etymology
Hericium means hedgehog in Latin.

History
The genus Hericium was originally described by Christian Hendrik Persoon in 1794. It was mentioned by Elias Magnus Fries in the Systema Mycologicum (1822); Fries considered it to be synonymous with the tribe Merisma of the genus Hydnum. In 1825 he recognized Hericium as a distinct genus, although not in the same sense as the genus would be known later. It is native to North America.

Phylogenetics
In 2004, the phylogenetic relationships of Hericium species were analysed by comparing the rDNA internal transcribed spacer sequences of H. abietis, H. alpestre, H. americanum, H. coralloides, H. erinaceum, H. erinaceus and H. laciniatum. This analysis separated H. erinaceum from the six other Hericium species, and showed that H. erinaceus, H. abietis, H. americanum, and H. coralloides are closely related each to other but genetically diverged from H. alpestre and H. laciniatum. Molecular genetic markers have been developed that allow for quick and sensitive identification of Hericium species using the polymerase chain reaction.

The family Hericiaceae, to which Hericium belongs, belongs to the russuloid clade of basidiomycetes, making it phylogenetically related to the Auriscalpiaceae, the Bondarzewiaceae, and the Echinodontiaceae.

Description
The fruit bodies typically have short stalks and are attached laterally to the host tree. Mature specimens are easily identified by drooping spines which hang down; the spines may be arranged in clusters or more usually, in rows. Positive identification of immature specimens can be more difficult as they often begin as a single clump, developing their branches as they age. They have no caps and contain spiny amyloid spores and numerous gloeopleurous hyphae filled with oil droplets. The spores are spherical to ellipsoid, smooth or covered with very fine warts.

Distribution and habitat
Hericium species are found extensively in the northern parts of the world, including North America, Europe, and Asia, often growing on old, fallen logs in dark and shaded areas of deciduous and Alpine forests.

Uses
Hericium species are commonly found and consumed in North America and China. The species is readily cultivated. Hericium is used in the folk medicine of China and Japan, but there is no high-quality clinical research as of 2020 to indicate that it has any medicinal or biological properties. The genus Hericium produces the phytochemicals, erinacines and hericenones, which are cyathane metabolites under basic research.

Species

References

Further reading
 Ginns, J. (1985). Hericium in North America: cultural characteristics and mating behavior. Canadian Journal of Botany 63: 1551–1563.
 Harrison, K. A. (1973). The genus Hericium in North America. Michigan Botanist 12: 177–194.

Russulales
Russulales genera